Slavgorod (also known as Slavgorod North) is an air base in Russia located 5 km south of Slavgorod, Altai Krai. It is an abandoned, decaying airfield that has a large taxiway pattern.

It was the home of the 59th Training Aviation Regiment of the Barnaul Higher Military Aviation School of Pilots (Siberian Military District) from 1968-1999.

References

External links
RussianAirFields.com

Soviet Air Force bases
Russian Air Force bases